Yours Sincerely is the debut studio album by Anna Bergendahl. It was released on 14 April 2010 and reached the top of the Swedish Albums Chart on 23 April 2010.

Singles
The lead single from the album,"This is My Life", was released on 28 February 2010. Anna Bergendahl performed the song in the Eurovision Song Contest 2010 representing Sweden, she failed to qualify for the final scored 62 points and finished 11th. "The Army" was released as the second single from the album on 31 August 2010.

Critical reception
Jon O'Brien from AllMusic rated the album 4.5 stars out of 5 and wrote, "Her uptempo tracks, then, are infinitely far more appealing than her slower numbers, but she possesses the kind of voice that's just aching for a heartfelt love song that would make her Eurovision disaster a distant memory. With Yours Sincerely, Bergendahl doesn't score on that front, but there's enough potential here to suggest that in the future she will."

Track listing
All tracks are produced by Dan Sundquist, except where noted.

Credits
All credits adapted from AllMusic.

Personnel

Vocal credits
Anna Bergendahl - lead vocals
Sara Borch - background vocals
Emma-Lisa Norrhamn - background vocals
Dan Sundquist - background vocals

Managerial and creative credits
Magdalena Erixon - hair stylist, make-up
Fredrik Järnberg - coordination
Maria Molin Ljunggren - executive producer

Technical credits

Erik Arvinder - string arrangements, strings, violin
Daniel Blendulf - cello
Josef Cabrales-Alin - violin
Mohammad Denebi - composer, dobro, guitar, producer, soloist, vocal recording
Björn Djupström - composer
Kristina Ebbersten - violin
Björn Engelmann - mastering
Brandur Enni - primary artist
Jakob Erixson - guitar (electric)
Andreas Forsman - violin
Pär Grebacken - clarinet, reeds
Pelle Hansen - cello
Bonnie Hayes - composer
Erik Holm - viola
Gudmund Ingvall - cello
Christer Jansson - drums
Karl-Ola S. Kjellholm - guitar  (acoustic)
Julia-Maria Kretz - violin
Kristian Lagerström - composer
Anna Larsson - violin
Erik Liljenberg - violin
Conny Lindgren - violin
Pår Lindqvist - viola

Bobby Ljunggren - composer
Tomas Lundström - cello
Johan Lyander- composer
Peter Lysell - double bass
Ylva Magnusson - violin
Mira Malik - violin
Daniel Migdal - violin
Erik Mjörnell - guitar
Emma-Lisa Norrhamn - clapping
Christopher Öhman - viola
Danijel Petrovic - double bass
Andrej Power - violin
Riikka Repo - viola
Aleksander Sätterström - violin
Mikael Sjögren - viola
Johanna Sjunnesson - cello
Torun Saeter Stavseng - cello
Martin Stensson - violin
Dan Sundquist - arranger, bass, clapping, composer, engineer, guitar, instrumentation, keyboards, mandoline, producer, programming, soloist, string arrangements
Jonatan Ljungh Sundquist - clapping
Christian Svarfvar - violin
Patrik Swedrup - violin
Fredrik Syberg - violin
Paul Waltman - violin

Charts

Weekly charts

Year-end charts

Certifications

Release history

References

2010 debut albums
Anna Bergendahl albums
Universal Music Group albums